The Kingarvie Stakes is a thoroughbred horse race run annually in late November/early December at Woodbine Racetrack in Toronto, Ontario, Canada. An Ontario Sire Stakes, it is a restricted race for two-year-old horses. Raced over a distance of  miles on Polytrack, the Kingarvie Stakes currently carries a purse of $94,913.

Inaugurated in 1975 at Greenwood Raceway as a one mile event, it was competed there until 1994 when it was moved to Woodbine Racetrack and set at a distance of  miles.

The race was named to honor Col. Samuel McLaughlin's Canadian Horse Racing Hall of Fame horse, Kingarvie.

Winners
 2018 - Dotted Line
 2018 - Dun Drum
 2017 - SIlent Sting
 2016 - Jurojin (Luis Contreras)
 2015 - Amis Gizmo (Luis Contreras)
 2014 - Kingsport (Jesse M. Campbell)
 2013 - Spadina Road
 2012 - Pyrite Mountain
 2011 - Run in Aruba
 2010 - Pender Harbour

References
 Kingarvie Stakes at Woodbine Entertainment Group

Ontario Sire Stakes
Ungraded stakes races in Canada
Flat horse races for two-year-olds
Recurring sporting events established in 1975
Woodbine Racetrack
Sport in Toronto
1975 establishments in Ontario